Youth Union of Turkey (TGB) is a Turkish anti-American, anti-Atlanticist, and Eurasianist revolutionary youth organization closely associated with the Patriotic Party. Founded on 19 May 2006, it comprises 65 student clubs and societies from over 40 Turkish universities.

TGB opposes any future Turkish membership in the European Union and any cooperation with what it calls "American imperialism". It has organized mass protests against the Justice and Development Party.

History
In 2011, members of the TGB put white sack over the head of a United States Navy sailor in Bodrum.
In 2013, the similar protest was made in İskenderun. They chanted "we do not allow Turkey to become the center of attack on the Middle East".

On November 12, 2014, members of the TGB protested United States Navy sailors from the  that were in Istanbul and telling them, in English, "You declare that you are a member of US Army, and now because we define you as murderers, as killers, we want to you, you to, get out of our land." They also chanted "yankee, go home" as they assaulted three sailors and chased them as they fled the scene. The incident was video recorded. The TGB put out a statement saying: "Bags we put over the American soldiers are for the nations of Palestine to Syria." Turkish police later arrested 12 members of the TGB who, in December, were charged for the assault and the Istanbul TGB President Uğur Aytaç said about the violent attack: "proud to be detained for such a reason."

Protests at the front of McDonald's restaurants
In 2008, this group held protests at the front of McDonald's restaurants. They chanted "Palestine is not alone in the crimes against Israel and the United States".
McDonald's has over 250 restaurants with 6000 employees in Turkey.

The TGB has opened Attilâ İlhan Cultural Centers in several cities to promote its values among young people. Its centers in Ankara, Istanbul, İzmir, Eskişehir and Afyon are to be followed by new ones in Bursa, Diyarbakır, Eskişehir, Sivas, Muğla, Mersin, Trabzon, Erzurum, Hatay, and Denizli.

References

External links
Official website
Turkish Nationalists Indicted in Attack on US Sailors
Turkish nationalist group defiant after attack on US Navy sailors

Eurasianism
Anti-Americanism
Anti-Western sentiment
Anti-Zionist organizations
Left-wing nationalism
Political organizations based in Turkey
Socialism in Turkey
Student organizations in Turkey
2006 establishments in Turkey